The 2021–22 Russian Premier League (known as the Tinkoff Russian Premier League, also written as Tinkoff Russian Premier Liga for sponsorship reason) was the 30th season of the premier football competition in Russia since the dissolution of the Soviet Union and the 18th under the current Russian Premier League name.

Teams
As in the previous season, 16 teams played in the 2021–22 season. After the 2020–21 season, Rotor Volgograd were relegated to the 2021–22 Russian Football National League after one season in Premier League while Tambov were dissolved.  They were replaced by Krylia Sovetov Samara and Nizhny Novgorod, the winners and third place of the 2020–21 Russian Football National League. 
FC Orenburg, the runner-up of 2020–21 Russian Football National League, didn't get the RFS 1 licence.

Venues

Personnel and kits

Managerial changes

Tournament format and regulations
The 16 teams played a round-robin tournament whereby each team plays each one of the other teams twice, once at home and once away. Thus, a total of 240 matches played, with 30 matches played by each team.

Promotion and relegation 
For the purpose of determining FNL positions for the following, the teams that will not pass 2022–23 RPL licensing or drop out of 2022–23 season for any other reason, or the second teams of RPL clubs (such as FC Krasnodar-2), or the teams that finished lower than 6th place in FNL standings will not be considered. For example, if the teams that finished 1st, 3rd and 4th in the FNL standings fail licensing, the team that finished 2nd will be considered 1st-placed team, the team that finished 5th will be considered 2nd-placed team and the team that finished 6th will be considered 3rd-placed team. There will be no designated 4th-placed team in this scenario.

The teams that finish 15th and 16th relegated to the FNL 2022–23, while the top 2 in that league promoted to the 2022–23 season.

The 13th and 14th Premier League teams will play the 4th and 3rd FNL 2021–22 teams respectively in two (home-and-away) playoff games, with away goals rule (including extra time of the return leg) and penalty shootout in effect, if necessary, the winners will secure Premier League spots for the 2022–23 season. If both of the teams that finish RPL in 13th and 14th place fail licensing for the 2022–23 season or drop out for any other reason, play-offs will not be held, and 3th and 4th FNL teams will be promoted automatically. If one of the teams that place 13th and 14th in the Premier League fails licensing for 2022–23 season or drops out for other reasons, 3rd FNL team will be promoted automatically and the 13th or 14th-placed team that passes licensing will play 4th FNL team in playoffs, with the winners securing the Premier League spot. If only one FNL team is eligible for the play-offs (as in the example scenario above), that team will play the 14th-placed RPL team in playoffs, with the winners securing the Premier League spot, and the 13th RPL team will remain in the league. If none of the FNL teams are eligible for the play-offs, they will not be held and 13th and 14th-placed RPL teams will remain in the league. If any of the teams are unable to participate in the season after the play-offs have been concluded, or there are not enough teams that pass licensing to follow the above procedures, the replacement will be chosen by the Russian Football Union in consultation with RPL and FNL.

Season events

COVID-19 pandemic
Due to the continuing COVID-19 pandemic in Russia, attendance for the games was limited. The specific restrictions are set by the appropriate local office of Rospotrebnadzor and therefore are not consistent between all clubs. FC Rostov played their initial home games without any fans in the stands, Moscow clubs were limited to 3,000 fans (with negative tests or proof of vaccination), Tatarstan office restricted FC Rubin Kazan attendance to 30% of stadium's capacity (approximately 15,000 fans) and most other games were limited to 500 fans. By late September, the limits were raised to 30% of capacity (with proof of vaccination) in Saint Petersburg and Moscow, while in some other locations the regulations remained more strict (such as 1,000 limit for home games of FC Ural Yekaterinburg). In December, the limit was raised to 70% of capacity (with proof of vaccination) in Moscow. All COVID-19-related restrictions were lifted on 3 March 2022 in Moscow and Saint Petersburg.

Issues related to the Russian invasion of Ukraine
On 24 February 2022, the Russian invasion of Ukraine began. The airports based in the provinces that are close to Ukraine were ordered closed until 2 March, including Platov International Airport in Rostov-on-Don and Krasnodar International Airport. For that reason, the games between FC Rostov and PFC Krylia Sovetov Samara and between FC Krasnodar and FC Lokomotiv Moscow, originally scheduled for 27 February, were postponed, with the other six games scheduled for the weekend going ahead. Ukrainian players, such as Ivan Ordets of Dynamo Moscow and Denys Kulakov of Ural Yekaterinburg, as well as Dynamo's assistant coach Andriy Voronin were not with their teams for the weekend's games. Voronin officially terminated his contract with Dynamo on 1 March, and Yaroslav Hodzyur of FC Ural Yekaterinburg was the first Ukrainian player to terminate his contract. In the following days, several more Ukrainian players terminated their contracts, and the ones who did not were not training with their clubs. The only Ukrainian player to appear in the early post-winter-break games was the new FC Lokomotiv Moscow signing Mark Mampassi, who also possesses Russian citizenship and was registered with the league as a domestic player. Several other players with dual Ukrainian-Russian citizenship (such as Daniil Khlusevich, Daniil Lesovoy or Ihor Kalinin) appeared for their clubs in later games, but none of the players who were registered with the league as Ukrainian citizens appeared on the field for the remainder of the season. On 11 March 2022, Ukrainian Association of Football stripped FC Zenit Saint Petersburg assistant coach Anatoliy Tymoshchuk of his coaching license and banned him from any football activity in Ukraine for not leaving Zenit and not making a public statement condemning Russia.

On 28 February 2022, FIFA and UEFA suspended Russian clubs from international competition until further notice.

On 1 March 2022, the airport closures were extended to 7 March. On the same day, FC Rostov confirmed that their game against PFC Sochi scheduled for 7 March will go ahead as scheduled. The game between FC Krasnodar and FC Ural Yekaterinburg was also not postponed, Ural flew into the Sochi International Airport and then took a 6.5-hour train ride into Krasnodar.

On 3 March 2022, FC Krasnodar announced that the contracts of 8 foreign players are suspended, but not terminated. The players would train on their own, but remain under contract.

On 7 March 2022, FIFA announced that foreign players in Russia would be able to unilaterally suspend their contracts with their clubs until 30 June 2022 (unless there is a mutual agreement reached with their Russian clubs otherwise before or on 10 March 2022) and sign with a club outside of Russia until 30 June 2022, and the transfer window is reopened for such players to sign and get registered for the new club until 7 April 2022. A foreign club would be allowed to sign at most two players under this condition. The first players to officially use the new rule and suspend their contracts were Luka Gagnidze and Luka Tsulukidze of FC Ural Yekaterinburg. In the following days, several foreign players, such as FC Krasnodar captain Grzegorz Krychowiak and FC Rubin Kazan captain Filip Uremović suspended their contracts under the new regulations, while some others, such as Wanderson and Júnior Alonso, were loaned out to foreign clubs without formally using the new rules. On 17 March 2022, German Football Association announced that the transfer window in Germany will not be re-opened and players from the Russian and Ukrainian leagues will not be allowed to be registered in German official national competitions to "maintain the sporting integrity of the competitions", despite FIFA giving permission to do so. Such players can participate in training and friendly games. It was reported that this decision blocked the transfer of Bastos from FC Rostov to Arminia Bielefeld that was allegedly arranged previously under the FIFA rule. Shortly after, it was reported that Italian Serie A and English Premier League would not re-open the transfer window for such players either, with the same justification as Germany (preserving the integrity of the competition), while Spanish La Liga did re-open the window. At the end of the special transfer window, 34 foreign players left their clubs or suspended their contracts after the invasion started. The transfers were not spread evenly across the clubs, most foreign players with Moscow-based clubs, Zenit Saint Petersburg and Sochi remained with their respective teams, while most of the core foreign players at clubs such as Krasnodar, Rostov or Rubin Kazan left.

Players who suspended their contracts

Jan Kuchta issue
On 6 March 2022, FC Lokomotiv Moscow started Jan Kuchta in their game against FC Khimki, Kuchta was signed during the winter break. Kuchta scored the winning goal in a 3–2 Lokomotiv victory. Before transferring to Lokomotiv, Kuchta was sent-off in his last game for his previous club Slavia Prague, and he moved to Lokomotiv before serving his one-game disqualification in the Czech First League. According to FIFA regulations, disqualification should be served in the player's new league in this scenario and Kuchta was not eligible to play for Lokomotiv. FC Khimki lodged a protest. The protest was denied on 10 March 2022, according to Russian Football Union, Kuchta should have been disqualified for the Russian Cup game Lokomotiv played against FC Yenisey Krasnoyarsk on 3 March and lost 0–4, as Czech regulations extend disqualifications to Cup games, even though Russian regulations do not, so he was technically disqualified for "one league or Cup game" as opposed to "one league game". Lokomotiv did not provide the document detailing the disqualification to the league, the club claimed they did not receive it during the transfer, and he was allowed by the RFU to play in the Cup game. His disqualification is considered served after that game, even though he actually played in it, as per FIFA regulations. Khimki considered lodging an appeal.

League table

Relegation play-offs

First leg

Second leg

Orenburg won 4–3 on aggregate and was promoted to the Russian Premier League, Ufa was relegated to the FNL.

Khimki won 3–1 on aggregate and retained their Russian Premier League spot, SKA-Khabarovsk remained in the FNL.

Results

Season statistics

Top goalscorers 
Source:

Awards

Monthly awards

Season awards

Russian Football Union awards
On 23 June 2022, Russian Football Union named its list of 33 top players:

Goalkeepers
 Matvei Safonov (Krasnodar)
 Igor Akinfeev (CSKA)
 Ilya Lantratov (Khimki)

Right backs
 Mário Fernandes (CSKA)
 Aleksei Sutormin (Zenit)
 Guillermo Varela (Dynamo)

Right-centre backs
 Fabián Balbuena (Dynamo)
 Igor Diveyev (CSKA)
 Maksim Osipenko (Rostov)

Left-centre backs
 Rodrigão (Sochi)
 Georgi Dzhikiya (Spartak)
 Dmitri Chistyakov (Zenit)

Left backs
 Douglas Santos (Zenit)
 Sergey Terekhov (Sochi)
 Danil Krugovoy (Zenit)

Right midfielders
 Malcom (Zenit)
 Zelimkhan Bakayev (Spartak)
 Daler Kuzyayev (Zenit)

Right central midfielders
 Christian Noboa (Sochi)
 Sebastian Szymański (Dynamo)
 Daniil Fomin (Dynamo)

Left central midfielders
 Claudinho (Zenit)
 Wilmar Barrios (Zenit)
 Danil Glebov (Rostov)

Left midfielders
 Arsen Zakharyan (Dynamo)
 Anton Zinkovsky (Krylia Sovetov)
 Dmitry Poloz (Rostov)

Right forwards
 Gamid Agalarov (Ufa)
 Rifat Zhemaletdinov (Lokomotiv)
 Artem Dzyuba (Zenit)

Left forwards
 Mateo Cassierra (Sochi)
 Ivan Sergeyev (Zenit)
 Eric Bicfalvi (Ural)

Other awards announced by RFU on the same day included:
 Best player: Christian Noboa (Sochi)
 Best coach: Sergei Semak (Zenit)
 Best team: FC Zenit Saint Petersburg
 Best young player: Arsen Zakharyan (Dynamo)
 For contribution to football development: Sergey Galitsky (Krasnodar)

Russian Premier League awards
 Player of the season: Claudinho (Zenit)
 Coach of the season: Sergei Semak (Zenit)
 Goal of the season: Kirill Shchetinin (Rostov 4–1 Lokomotiv, 10 April 2022)
 Young player of the season: Gamid Agalarov (Ufa)
 Goalkeeper of the season: Igor Akinfeev (CSKA)

Season records 
 For the first time in the history of the Russian Premier League, there was no scoreless draws for 61 consecutive matches (23 July 2021 to 19 September 2021) until FC Ural Yekaterinburg and FC Lokomotiv Moscow finished with the 0–0 score on 20 September 2021.

References

External links

https://www.championat.com/football/_russiapl.html
https://rsport.ria.ru/20210216/futbol-1597726161.html
https://www.championat.com/football/_russiapl/tournament/4465/calendar/

Russian Premier League seasons
1
Russian Premier League|Rus
Sports events affected by the 2022 Russian invasion of Ukraine